Ndrangith (Ndrrangith) is a presumed Australian language once spoken in the Cape York Peninsula of Queensland.  It is undocumented, without even word lists to record it.

Sutton (2001) says the name is distinct from the similar-sounding Ndra'ngith language and Ndwa'ngith language.

References

Northern Paman languages
Extinct languages of Queensland
Unclassified languages of Australia